The 2022–23 Portland Trail Blazers season is the 53rd season of the franchise in the National Basketball Association (NBA).

Draft picks

The Trail Blazers entered the draft holding one first round pick and two second round picks.

Roster

Standings

Division

Conference

Game log

Preseason 

|-style="background:#fcc;
| 1
| October 3
| vs. L.A. Clippers
| 
| Damian Lillard (16)
| Josh Hart (10)
| Josh Hart (4)
| Climate Pledge Arena18,440
| 0–1
|-style="background:#fcc;
| 2
| October 4
| Utah
| 
| Damian Lillard (21)
| Josh Hart (7) 
| Damian Lillard (6)
| Moda Center15,197
| 0–2
|-style="background:#cfc;
| 3
| October 6
| Maccabi Ra'anana
| 
| Shaedon Sharpe (27)
| Jabari Walker (7)
| Keon Johnson (11)
| Moda Center10,622
| 1–2
|-style="background:#fcc;
| 4
| October 9
| @ Sacramento
| 
| Jerami Grant (17)
| Jusuf Nurkić (9)
| Damian Lillard (6)
| Golden 1 Center14,250
| 1–3
|-style="background:#fcc;
| 5
| October 11
| @ Golden State
| 
| Shaedon Sharpe (17)
| Josh Hart (8)
| Keon Johnson (5)
| Chase Center18,064
| 1–4

Regular season 

|-style="background:#cfc
| 1
| October 19
| @ Sacramento
| 
| Jerami Grant (23)
| Grant, Winslow (8)
| Damian Lillard (8)
| Golden 1 Center17,611
| 1–0
|-style="background:#cfc
| 2
| October 21
| Phoenix
| 
| Damian Lillard (41)
| Jusuf Nurkić (17)
| Hart, Lillard, Simons (3)
| Moda Center19,393
| 2–0
|-style="background:#cfc
| 3
| October 23
| @ L.A. Lakers
| 
| Damian Lillard (41)
| Josh Hart (16)
| Josh Hart (5)
| Crypto.com Arena18,997
| 3–0
|-style="background:#cfc
| 4
| October 24
| Denver
| 
| Damian Lillard (31)
| Jusuf Nurkić (12)
| Damian Lillard (8)
| Moda Center18,111
| 4–0
|-style="background:#fcc;
| 5
| October 26
| Miami
| 
| Damian Lillard (22)
| Jusuf Nurkić (9)
| Josh Hart (6)
| Moda Center18,578
| 4–1
|-style="background:#cfc
| 6
| October 28
| Houston
| 
| Anfernee Simons (30)
| Jusuf Nurkić (15)
| Simons, Winslow (7)
| Moda Center19,082
| 5–1

|-style="background:#fcc;"
| 7
| November 2
| Memphis
| 
| Anfernee Simons (31)
| Jusuf Nurkić (13)
| Anfernee Simons (8) 
| Moda Center19,462
| 5–2
|-style="background:#cfc
| 8
| November 4
| @ Phoenix
| 
| Jerami Grant (30)
| Justise Winslow (9)
| Justise Winslow (9)
| Footprint Center17,071
| 6–2
|-style="background:#fcc
| 9
| November 5
| @ Phoenix
| 
| Jerami Grant (14)
| Grant, Hart (7)
| Josh Hart (8)
| Footprint Center17,071
| 6–3
|-style="background:#cfc
| 10
| November 7
| @ Miami
| 
| Anfernee Simons (25)
| Jusuf Nurkić (11)
| Josh Hart (12)
| FTX Arena19,600
| 7–3
|-style="background:#cfc;"
| 11
| November 9
| @ Charlotte
| 
| Damian Lillard (26)
| Josh Hart (11)
| Damian Lillard (7)
| Spectrum Center14,774
| 8–3
|-style="background:#cfc
| 12
| November 10
| @ New Orleans
| 
| Jerami Grant (27)
| Eubanks, Grant, Winslow (8)
| Simons, Winslow (6)
| Smoothie King Center14,289
| 9–3
|-style="background:#fcc
| 13
| November 12
| @ Dallas
| 
| Jerami Grant (37)
| Josh Hart (9)
| Damian Lillard (12)
| American Airlines Center20,277
| 9–4
|-style="background:#cfc
| 14
| November 15
| San Antonio
| 
| Jerami Grant (29)
| Jerami Grant (8)
| Damian Lillard (11)
| Moda Center19,012
| 10–4
|-style="background:#fcc
| 15
| November 17
| Brooklyn
| 
| Damian Lillard (25)
| Jusuf Nurkić (8)
| Damian Lillard (11)
| Moda Center19,193
| 10–5
|-style="background:#fcc
| 16
| November 19
| Utah
| 
| Anfernee Simons (23)
| Hart, Simons (8)
| Lillard, Simons (7)
| Moda Center19,595
| 10–6
|-style="background:#fcc
| 17
| November 21
| @ Milwaukee
| 
| Anfernee Simons (29)
| Jusuf Nurkić (10)
| Anfernee Simons (5)
| Fiserv Forum17,341
| 10–7
|-style="background:#fcc
| 18
| November 23
| @ Cleveland
| 
| Jusuf Nurkić (22)
| Eubanks, Nurkić (6)
| Simons, Winslow (6)
| Rocket Mortgage FieldHouse19,432
| 10–8
|- style="background:#cfc;"
| 19
| November 25
| @ New York
| 
| Jerami Grant (44)
| Josh Hart (19)
| Jusuf Nurkić (7)
| Madison Square Garden19,812
| 11–8
|-style="background:#fcc;"
| 20
| November 27
| @ Brooklyn
| 
| Jerami Grant (29)
| Jusuf Nurkić (14)
| Simons, Winslow (6)
| Barclays Center17,732
| 11–9
|-style="background:#fcc;"
| 21
| November 29
| L.A. Clippers
| 
| Anfernee Simons (37)
| Justise Winslow (13)
| Jusuf Nurkić (7)
| Moda Center17,251
| 11–10
|-style="background:#fcc;"
| 22
| November 30
| @ L.A. Lakers
| 
| Jerami Grant (27)
| Nurkić, Watford (10)
| Anfernee Simons (8)
| Crypto.com Arena18,560
| 11–11

|-style="background:#cfc;"
| 23
| December 3
| @ Utah
| 
| Anfernee Simons (45)
| Nurkić, Watford (14)
| Grant, Winslow (5)
| Vivint Arena18,206
| 12–11
|-style="background:#cfc;"
| 24
| December 4
| Indiana
| 
| Jerami Grant (28)
| Josh Hart (10)
| Lillard, Simons (6)
| Moda Center17,579
| 13–11
|-style="background:#fcc;"
| 25
| December 8
| Denver
| 
| Damian Lillard (40)
| Jusuf Nurkić (9)
| Damian Lillard (12)
| Moda Center18,189
| 13–12
|-style="background:#cfc;"
| 26
| December 10
| Minnesota
| 
| Damian Lillard (36)
| Jusuf Nurkić (15)
| Damian Lillard (8)
| Moda Center18,324
| 14–12
|-style="background:#cfc;"
| 27
| December 12
| Minnesota
| 
| Damian Lillard (38)
| Jusuf Nurkić (16)
| Justise Winslow (10)
| Moda Center18,021
| 15–12
|-style="background:#cfc;"
| 28
| December 14
| @ San Antonio
| 
| Damian Lillard (37)
| Josh Hart (10)
| Damian Lillard (8)
| AT&T Center13,657
| 16–12
|-style="background:#fcc;"
| 29
| December 16
| @ Dallas
| 
| Damian Lillard (24)
| Trendon Watford (11)
| Trendon Watford (6)
| American Airlines Center20,191
| 16–13
|-style="background:#cfc;"
| 30
| December 17
| @ Houston
| 
| Anfernee Simons (32)
| Josh Hart (13)
| Damian Lillard (10)
| Toyota Center16,217
| 17–13
|-style="background:#fcc;"
| 31
| December 19
| @ Oklahoma City
| 
| Damian Lillard (28)
| Grant, Hart (8)
| Hart, Lillard (6)
| Paycom Center14,672
| 17–14
|-style="background:#fcc;"
| 32
| December 21
| @ Oklahoma City
| 
| Jerami Grant (17)
| Eubanks, Watford (7)
| Damian Lillard (8)
| Paycom Center15,107
| 17–15
|-style="background:#fcc;"
| 33
| December 23
| @ Denver
| 
| Damian Lillard (34)
| Josh Hart (11)
| Damian Lillard (8)
| Ball Arena19,619
| 17–16
|-style="background:#cfc;"
| 34
| December 26
| Charlotte
| 
| Jerami Grant (32)
| Jusuf Nurkić (15)
| Damian Lillard (9)
| Moda Center19,530
| 18–16
|-style="background:#fcc;"
| 35
| December 30
| @ Golden State
| 
| Damian Lillard (34)
| Josh Hart (11)
| Josh Hart (7)
| Chase Center18,064
| 18–17

|-style="background:#cfc;"
| 36
| January 2
| Detroit
| 
| Jerami Grant (36)
| Drew Eubanks (10)
| Damian Lillard (10)
| Moda Center19,393
| 19–17
|-style="background:#fcc;"
| 37
| January 4
| @ Minnesota
| 
| Damian Lillard (27)
| Jusuf Nurkić (8)
| Damian Lillard (6)
| Target Center15,434
| 19–18
|-style="background:#fcc;"
| 38
| January 6
| @ Indiana
| 
| Anfernee Simons (20)
| Jusuf Nurkić (19)
| Hart, Lillard (8)
| Gainbridge Fieldhouse16,548
| 19–19
|-style="background:#fcc;"
| 39
| January 8
| @ Toronto
| 
| Damian Lillard (34)
| Jusuf Nurkić (18)
| Damian Lillard (8)
| Scotiabank Arena19,800
| 19–20
|-style="background:#fcc;"
| 40
| January 10
| Orlando
| 
| Damian Lillard (30)
| Josh Hart (13)
| Anfernee Simons (7)
| Moda Center18,176
| 19–21
|-style="background:#fcc;"
| 41
| January 12
| Cleveland
| 
| Damian Lillard (50)
| Jusuf Nurkić (12)
| Anfernee Simons (5)
| Moda Center18,105
| 19–22
|-style="background:#cfc;"
| 42
| January 14
| Dallas
| 
| Damian Lillard (36)
| Jusuf Nurkić (11)
| Damian Lillard (10)
| Moda Center19,393
| 20–22
|-style="background:#cfc;"
| 43
| January 15
| Dallas
| 
| Damian Lillard (40)
| Josh Hart (12)
| Damian Lillard (6)
| Moda Center19,393
| 21–22
|-style="background:#fcc;"
| 44
| January 17
| @ Denver
| 
| Damian Lillard (44)
| Jusuf Nurkić (10)
| Damian Lillard (8)
| Ball Arena18,258
| 21–23
|-style="background:#fcc;"
| 45
| January 19
| Philadelphia
| 
| Damian Lillard (25)
| Jusuf Nurkić (11)
| Damian Lillard (11)
| Moda Center18,113
| 21–24
|-style="background:#fcc;"
| 46
| January 22
| L.A. Lakers
| 
| Anfernee Simons (31)
| Drew Eubanks (11)
| Damian Lillard (10)
| Moda Center19,393
| 21–25
|-style="background:#cfc;"
| 47
| January 23
| San Antonio
| 
| Damian Lillard (37)
| Jusuf Nurkić (11)
| Damian Lillard (12)
| Moda Center17,874
| 22–25
|-style="background:#cfc;"
| 48
| January 25
| Utah
| 
| Damian Lillard (60)
| Drew Eubanks (10)
| Anfernee Simons (9)
| Moda Center18,154
| 23–25
|-style="background:#fcc;"
| 49
| January 28
| Toronto
| 
| Damian Lillard (30)
| Jerami Grant (8)
| Anfernee Simons (4) 
| Moda Center19,393
| 23–26
|-style="background:#cfc;"
| 50
| January 30
| Atlanta
| 
| Damian Lillard (42)
| Josh Hart (12)
| Anfernee Simons (7) 
| Moda Center18,262
| 24–26

|-style="background:#cfc;"
| 51
| February 1
| @ Memphis
| 
| Damian Lillard (42)
| Drew Eubanks (11)
| Damian Lillard (10)
| FedExForum14,589
| 25–26
|-style="background:#cfc;"
| 52
| February 3
| @ Washington
| 
| Anfernee Simons (33)
| Josh Hart (9)
| Lillard, Simons (6)
| Capital One Arena20,476
| 26–26
|-style="background:#fcc;"
| 53
| February 4
| @ Chicago
| 
| Damian Lillard (40)
| Josh Hart (12)
| Hart, Lillard, Simons (5)
| United Center20,135
| 26–27
|-style="background:#fcc;"
| 54
| February 6
| Milwaukee
| 
| Damian Lillard (28)
| Josh Hart (8)
| Eubanks, Lillard, Simons (5)
| Moda Center18,110
| 26–28
|-style="background:#cfc;"
| 55
| February 8
| Golden State
| 
| Damian Lillard (33)
| Damian Lillard (10)
| Damian Lillard (11)
| Moda Center18 450
| 27–28
|-style="background:#fcc;"
| 56
| February 10
| Oklahoma City
| 
| Damian Lillard (38)
| Drew Eubanks (8)
| Damian Lillard (9)
| Moda Center19,424
| 27–29
|-style="background:#cfc;"
| 57
| February 13
| L.A. Lakers
| 
| Damian Lillard (40)
| Drew Eubanks (9)
| Anfernee Simons (6)
| Moda Center18,299
| 28–29
|-style="background:#fcc;"
| 58
| February 14
| Washington
| 
| Damian Lillard (39)
| Drew Eubanks (11)
| Damian Lillard (6)
| Moda Center18,004
| 28–30
|-style="background:#fcc;"
| 59
| February 23
| @ Sacramento
| 
| Nassir Little (26)
| Drew Eubanks (7)
| Ryan Arcidiacono (6)
| Golden 1 Center18,041
| 28–31
|-style="background:#cfc;"
| 60
| February 26
| Houston
| 
| Damian Lillard (71)
| Nassir Little (9)
| Damian Lillard (6)
| Moda Center19,215
| 29–31
|-style="background:#fcc;"
| 61
| February 28
| @ Golden State
| 
| Damian Lillard (25)
| Drew Eubanks (8)
| Lillard, Watford (7)
| Chase Center18,064
| 29–32

|-style="background:#fcc;"
| 62
| March 1
| New Orleans
| 
| Damian Lillard (41)
| Lillard, Thybulle (8)
| Trendon Watford (6)
| Moda Center18,566
| 29–33
|-style="background:#fcc;"
| 63
| March 3
| @ Atlanta
| 
| Damian Lillard (33)
| Drew Eubanks (7)
| Damian Lillard (8)
| State Farm Arena17,521
| 29–34
|-style="background:#cfc;"
| 64
| March 5
| @ Orlando
| 
| Damian Lillard (41)
| Damian Lillard (9)
| Jerami Grant (7)
| Amway Center18,846
| 30–34
|-style="background:#cfc;"
| 65
| March 6
| @ Detroit
| 
| Damian Lillard (31)
| Damian Lillard (13)
| Damian Lillard (12)
| Little Caesars Arena16,989
| 31–34
|-style="background:#fcc;"
| 66
| March 8
| @ Boston
| 
| Damian Lillard (27)
| Trendon Watford (10)
| Damian Lillard (8)
| TD Garden19,156
| 31–35
|-style="background:#fcc;"
| 67
| March 10
| @ Philadelphia
| 
| Anfernee Simons (34)
| Jerami Grant (10)
| Damian Lillard (11)
| Wells Fargo Center21,001
| 31–36
|-style="background:#fcc;"
| 68
| March 12
| @ New Orleans
| 
| Anfernee Simons (17)
| Eubanks, Watford (7)
| Grant, Little, Simons (4)
| Smoothie King Center16,676
| 31–37
|-style="background:#fcc;"
| 69
| March 14
| New York
| 
| Damian Lillard (38)
| Jusuf Nurkić (10)
| Damian Lillard (7)
| Moda Center19,488
| 31–38
|-style="background:#fcc;"
| 70
| March 17
| Boston
| 
| Damian Lillard (41)
| Nurkić, Watford (8)
| Trendon Watford (8)
| Moda Center19,393
| 31–39
|-style="background:#fcc;"
| 71
| March 19
| L.A. Clippers
| 
| Jusuf Nurkić (23)
| Jusuf Nurkić (11)
| Damian Lillard (9)
| Moda Center18,714
| 31–40
|-style="background:
| 72
| March 22
| @ Utah
| 
| 
| 
| 
| Vivint Arena
| 
|-style="background:
| 73
| March 24
| Chicago
| 
| 
| 
| 
| Moda Center
| 
|-style="background:
| 74
| March 26
| Oklahoma City
| 
| 
| 
| 
| Moda Center
| 
|-style="background:
| 75
| March 27
| New Orleans
| 
| 
| 
| 
| Moda Center
| 
|-style="background:
| 76
| March 29
| Sacramento
| 
| 
| 
| 
| Moda Center
| 
|-style="background:
| 77
| March 31
| Sacramento
| 
| 
| 
| 
| Moda Center
| 

|-style="background:
| 78
| April 2
| @ Minnesota
| 
| 
| 
| 
| Target Center
| 
|-style="background:
| 79
| April 4
| @ Memphis
| 
| 
| 
| 
| FedEx Forum
| 
|-style="background:
| 80
| April 6
| @ San Antonio
| 
| 
| 
| 
| Moody Center
| 
|-style="background:
| 81
| April 8
| @ L.A. Clippers
| 
| 
| 
| 
| Moda Center
| 
|-style="background:
| 82
| April 9
| Golden State
| 
| 
| 
| 
| Moda Center
|

Transactions

Overview

Trades

Free agency

Re-signed

Additions

Subtractions

References

Portland Trail Blazers seasons
Portland Trail Blazers
Portland Trail Blazers
Portland Trail Blazers
Portland
Portland